Harpalus brevis is a species of ground beetle in the subfamily Harpalinae. It was described by Victor Motschulsky in 1844.

References

brevis
Beetles described in 1844